Firaaq (English: Separation) is a 2008 Hindi political thriller film set one month after the 2002 violence in Gujarat, India and looks at the aftermath in its effects on the lives of everyday people. It claims to be based on "a thousand true stories". Firaaq means both separation and quest in Arabic. The film is the directorial debut of actress Nandita Das and stars Naseeruddin Shah, Deepti Naval, Nawazuddin Siddiqui, Inaamulhaq, Nassar (actor), Paresh Rawal, Sanjay Suri, Raghubir Yadav, Shahana Goswami, Amruta Subhash and Tisca Chopra.

The film has largely been well received locally and internationally. Firaaq won three awards at the Asian Festival of First Films in Singapore in December 2008, the Special Prize at the International Thessaloniki Film Festival, and an award at the Kara Film Festival in Pakistan. It won two National Film Awards at 56th National Film Awards. The film was banned in Gujarat owing to the communally sensitive subject of the film.

Plot 
Firaaq follows the life of several ordinary people, some who were victims, some silent observers, and some perpetrators one month after the 2002 violence in Gujarat. It focuses on how their lives are affected and (irrevocably) changed.

The story is set over a 24-hour period, one month after a carnage that took place in Gujarat, India in 2002. This sectarian violence killed more than 900 Muslims and 300+ Hindus (reported), hundreds of thousands were made homeless on both sides.

Khan Saheb (Naseeruddin Shah) is an elderly Muslim classical vocalist, who remains blissfully optimistic of the situation happening around him. His servant, Karim Mian (Raghubir Yadav), tries to alert him to the problems the Muslim community is facing, but Khan Saheb only realises the extent of the trauma upon seeing the destruction of a shrine dedicated to the Sufi saint, Wali Gujarati. A middle-age Hindu housewife, Aarti (Deepti Naval), is traumatised because she did not help a Muslim woman being chased by a mob and finds a way to atone for her sins upon finding Mohsin, a Muslim orphan who wanders the city in search for his family. Meanwhile, her husband, Sanjay (Paresh Rawal), and his brother, Deven (Dilip Joshi), try to bribe police officers to prevent Deven's arrest for gang-rape. Muneera (Shahana Goswami) and her husband Hanif (Nawazuddin Siddiqui), are a young Muslim couple who return home only to find it looted and burnt. Muneera struggles to relate to her Hindu neighbour Jyoti (Amruta Subash) in the following days, as she suspects her for taking part in the looting. Hanif, along with several other Muslim men, plan to retaliate against the violence and their helplessness by searching for a gun to exact revenge. Sameer Shaikh (Sanjay Suri) and Anuradha Desai (Tisca Chopra) are a wealthy, interreligious couple, whose store was burnt during the carnage. They decide to move to Delhi to escape the violence and Sameer comes into conflict with his wife's family over expressing his identity as a Muslim in India.

Through these characters we experience the consequences of violence that impact their inner and outer lives. Violence spares nobody. Yet in the midst of all this madness, some find it in their hearts to sing hopeful songs for better times.

Cast 
 Naseeruddin Shah as Jaagir Khan Saheb
 Deepti Naval as Aarti
 Sanjay Suri as Sameer Arshad Shaikh
 Nawazuddin Siddiqui as Hanif
 Inaamulhaq as Munna
 Paresh Rawal as Sanjay
 Sumeet Raghavan as Dr. Subhash
 Raghubir Yadav as Karim
 Mohammad Samad as Mohsin
 Shahana Goswami as Muneera
 Amruta Subhash as Jyoti
 Tisca Chopra as Anuradha Desai
 Shafi as Ghogha
 Dr Sridhar Kumar as police cop
 Ruhi Singh as Sakina
 Nassar as Grave Digger
 Dilip Joshi as Deven
 Rahul Singh as Rajat, Ketaki's husband
 Jasbir Thandi as Cop at Lucky's restaurant
 Honey Chhaya as Bapuji
 Sucheta Trivedi as Ketaki
 Sakina as Ruhi

Music
Composed by Piyush Kanojia and Rajat Dholakia, the lyrics of the songs are penned by Gulzar.

Reception
Firaaq won top honours at the Asian Festival of First Films 2008 in Singapore, where it won the awards for "Best Film", "Screenplay / Script", and "Foreign Correspondents Assn. Purple Orchid Award for Best Film". The film has won awards at other international festivals, including the Special Prize award at the International Thessaloniki Film Festival in Greece, the Special Jury Award at the International Film Festival of Kerala, and the Best Editor award for Sreekar Prasad at the Dubai International Film Festival. It won an award at the Kara Film Festival in Pakistan. Gautam Sen for "its perfect use of props and choice of colours to enhance the ambience of a post-riots" won National Film Award for Best Art Direction. A. Sreekar Prasad also won a National Film Award for "aesthetically weaving together unrelated sequences to heighten the dramatic impact" in the Best Editing category at the 56th National Film Awards.

It was released in India on 20 March 2009 and received critical acclaim. Taran Adarsh in his review of the film on Bollywood Hungama called it disturbing, powerful and thought-provoking and gave it 4.5 stars out of five.

Awards and honours
2009 Kara Film Festival
Won – Best Film

2008 Asian Festival of First Films
Won – Best Film
Won – Best Screenplay
Won – Foreign Correspondents Association Purple Orchid Award for Best Film

2009 International Film Festival of Kerala
Won – Special Jury Award

2009 International Thessaloniki Film Festival
Won – Special Prize (Everyday Life: Transcendence or Reconciliation Award)
Nominated – Golden Alexander for Best Film

19th Cinequest Film Festival San Jose, USA (2009)
Won – The Maverick Spirit Award

56th National Film Awards (2009)
Best Art Direction – Gautam Sen
Best Editing – A. Sreekar Prasad

55th Filmfare Awards (2010)
Critics Award for Best Movie
Special Award – Nandita Das
Best Editing – A. Sreekar Prasad
Best Sound Design – Manas Chaudhury
Best Costume Design – Vaishali Menon

See also
Barkha Dutt

References

External links
 
 
 Review – The Hindu
 Review – Indian Express
 Review – NDTV
 Review – Upperstall
 Review – Mid Day
 Review – Zee News

2008 films
2000s Hindi-language films
Hyperlink films
Films set in India
Films set in Ahmedabad
Films about religious violence in India
Films about Hinduism
Films about Islam
Films shot in Ahmedabad
Films whose editor won the Best Film Editing National Award
Films whose production designer won the Best Production Design National Film Award
2008 directorial debut films